Lyle is a 2014 American psychological thriller drama film written and directed by Stewart Thorndike. The film tells the dramatic story of a mother grieving over the death of her toddler. The film stars actress Gaby Hoffmann in the lead role. Lyle was billed "as a lesbian Rosemary's Baby ."

Plot summary
A young couple moving into a new home suffer a guilt & grief filled journey to losing their child. Soon mysterious feelings abound as those around them seem to harbor plans for the couple's next newborn child.

Cast
 Gaby Hoffmann as Leah
 Ingrid Jungermann as June
 Eleanor Hopkins as Lyle
 Rebecca Street as Karen
 Michael Che as Threes
 Kim Allen as Taylor
 Ashlie Atkinson as Therapist

Reception
Sheri Linden of The Hollywood Reporter said "Gaby Hoffmann's ferocious unraveling is the main attraction in this well-done but slightly new-millennium riff on Rosemary's Baby."

References

2014 films
2014 horror films
2014 drama films
2010s horror drama films
American horror drama films
American LGBT-related films
Lesbian-related films
2010s English-language films
2010s American films